Elaphrus lheritieri is a species of ground beetle in the subfamily Elaphrinae. It was described by Antonie in 1947.

References

Elaphrinae
Beetles described in 1947